Yas Air is an Iranian airline which was a prominent commercial airline but now focuses on cargo only.

Destinations
  Tehran — Tehran Mehrabad International Airport (Hub/Base)
  Mashhad — Mashhad International Airport

Fleet

Current
 2 Ilyushin Il-76

Past
 1 Antonov An-74 (Cargo)
 1 Antonov An-74T 
 2 Antonov An-74TK
 1 Airbus A320-211 (Passenger)

References

Airlines of Iran